Late Gupta may refer to:

The later part of the Indian Gupta Empire ("Imperial Guptas"), perhaps from c. 450 to c. 550 
The subsequent, and much less important, Later Guptas, a dynasty in Eastern India, ruling from c. 490 to c. 750.